The 2013–2014 San Diego mayoral special election was a special election to elect the Mayor of San Diego. The election was made necessary by the resignation of Bob Filner on August 30, 2013. The winner stood to serve out the balance of Filner's term, which ended in 2016.

The election was nonpartisan, in accordance with the California Constitution, and candidates appeared on the ballot with no party affiliation, although most chose to state a political party affiliation. A primary election was held on November 19, 2013. Since no candidate received a majority of the vote in the first round, a runoff election was held between the top two vote-getters on February 11, 2014. In the runoff, Kevin Faulconer defeated David Alvarez.

Filner's resignation
In July 2013, Filner was accused of sexual harassment by multiple women. Despite continuing pressure to resign, he remained in office until he and the city reached a mediated agreement in August 2013, under which he agreed to resign and the city of San Diego agreed to help pay his legal fees. According to the city charter, Todd Gloria, the president of the San Diego City Council, served as interim mayor until a new mayor was sworn into office.

Candidates

Declared
 Mike Aguirre, former San Diego city attorney
 David Alvarez, San Diego city councilman
 Hud Collins, lawyer
 Bruce Coons, executive director of Save Our Heritage Organisation
 Harry Dirks, business administrator and realtor
 Kevin Faulconer, San Diego city councilman
 Nathan Fletcher, former state representative and mayoral candidate in 2012
 Michael Kemmer, student
 Sina "Simon" Moghadam, businessman and engineer
 Tobiah Pettus, construction superintendent and mayoral candidate in 2012
 Lincoln Pickard, retired contractor and gun rights advocate

Declined
 Toni Atkins, Majority Leader of the California State Assembly and former Acting Mayor
 Ruben Barrales, former aide to George W. Bush, former CEO of the San Diego Regional Chamber of Commerce
 Carl DeMaio, former San Diego City Councilman and mayoral candidate in 2012 (running for Congress)
 Bonnie Dumanis, San Diego County District Attorney and mayoral candidate in 2012
 Donna Frye, former San Diego city councilwoman and mayoral candidate in 2004 and 2005
 Todd Gloria, interim mayor of San Diego and president of San Diego City Council
 Jan Goldsmith, San Diego City Attorney
 Lorena Gonzalez, state representative
 William Gore, San Diego County Sheriff
 Christine Kehoe, former state senator
 Ron Roberts, San Diego County Supervisor and mayoral candidate in 1992, 2000, and 2004
 Matt Romney, investor and son of Mitt Romney
 Lori Saldaña, former state representative

Special election
In the special election held November 19, 2013, Kevin Faulconer received 43.6 percent of the vote and David Alvarez received 25.6 percent. The two of them advanced to a runoff election on February 11, 2014. Nathan Fletcher narrowly missed the runoff with 24.3 percent of the vote, just as he had when he previously run in the 2012 mayoral election. Mike Aguirre placed a distant fourth with 4.4 percent. The other eight candidates each received less than 1 percent of the vote each.

Polling

Results
Although local elections are officially non-partisan per the California constitution, major candidates typically publicly align themselves with political parties. Therefore, political preference of candidates is indicated in the table below where it is known.

Special run-off election
On February 11, 2014, Kevin Faulconer received 52.9 percent majority in the run-off vote and was elected Mayor of San Diego.

Polling

With Aguirre

With DeMaio

With Fletcher

With Frye

With Gloria

With Goldsmith

Results

References

2013–2014
2013–2014
2013 California elections
2014 California elections
2013 United States mayoral elections
2014 United States mayoral elections
February 2014 events in the United States
California special elections
United States mayoral special elections